Levo (formerly Levo League) was a network for millennials in the workplace. The company provided young professionals with resources to help them navigate and advance their careers.

History
Launched in 2012, Levo was founded by Caroline Ghosn (daughter of auto tycoon Carlos Ghosn) and Amanda Pouchot, as well as two other women, Kathryn Minshew and Alex Cavoulacos (see Controversy). The founders met at their first corporate jobs working for the management consulting firm McKinsey & Company in New York. At McKinsey Ghosn and Pouchot discussed the limited opportunities and resources available to young women professionals in their office and in 2011 the two women left McKinsey to found Levo.

The start-up raised over $8 million in funding, adding $7 million from its round of Angel funding in early 2014. Prominent U.S. investors in Levo include Sheryl Sandberg, COO of Facebook, Susan Lyne, Chairman of Gilt Groupe, and Gina Bianchini, CEO of Mightybell.

Levo claimed over 9 million users and conducted interviews with some of the world’s top executives and leaders, including Warren Buffett, Sheryl Sandberg, Jacqueline Novogratz, Nanette Lepore, Soledad O’Brien and Kevin Spacey as part of the company’s “Office Hours” program.

Services
Levo granted its members digital access to mentors, a community of professionals, job postings, and live chats with prominent business role models. In addition to its online community the group also operates 30 local chapters worldwide to help its users to connect to opportunities offline.

Controversy
Levo was founded as Pretty Young Professional by four women who worked in the NYC office of McKinsey & Company: Caroline Ghosn, Amanda Pouchot, Alex Cavoulacos, and Kathryn Minshew, with an equity structure that reflected ownership by all (Minshew 7.1%, Pouchot 5.5%, Cavoulacos 4.4%, Ghosn 1.5%).  Minshew was the first full-time employee and Editor in Chief, and eventually CEO. 

After a dispute between the founders, Ghosn and Pouchot secretly re-launched Pretty Young Professional as Levo League and ousted founders Cavoulacos and Mishew, who went on to found The Daily Muse.

References

Further reading
 
 

Defunct technology companies of the United States
American companies established in 2012
Technology companies established in 2012
2012 establishments in the United States